Richard de St. Martin, Vicar of Donabate, was Dean of St Patrick's Cathedral, Dublin  from 1250 until 1275.

References

Deans of St. Patrick's Cathedral, Dublin
13th-century Irish Roman Catholic priests